Kildale is a village and civil parish in Hambleton district of North Yorkshire, England. The parish occupies , with  being taken up by moorland.

A church at Kildale was referred to in the Domesday Book. Viking relics (bones, swords, daggers and a battle axe) were discovered on the spot where a later church, St Cuthbert's, was erected.

Kildale railway station is on the Esk Valley Line.

History

Origins 
The name of the village, Kildale has derived from Norman times where it was scribed as Childale. The transition from 'Chil' to 'Kil' is uncertain. Many believe the name changed to 'Kil' in the Saxon times as a result of the Norse Kyll stream or after the name of a Saxon proprietor patronymic.

In 900 years the boundaries of Kildale have never changed, along with only ever being in the hands of three families. Kildale was in the hands of the Percy family from an early date. Around 1662 John Turner purchased Kildale, then after the death of the last Turner in 1806, Kildale was then bought by Robert Bell Livesey of Thirsk, who then passed the parish of Kildale down to his daughter who married into the Turton family and is still owned by the Turton family today. 
Stone built walls were built as boundaries to enclose Kildale's fields and many are still standing today, over 300 years later. Stone was used to build the walls as during this time period, it was easier to get hold of than wood. Using stone to build the walls came at a great expense and took a long time to build, therefore the estate acknowledges this and ensures the stone walls are well managed even today, to maintain the structure of the stone walls in hope they should last forever holding on to Kildale's historical landscape. Kildale is in fact an estate and all the farms and the majority of houses are owned by the estate. The houses owned by the estate are only let to people who live in the dale to ensure a strong community is held, holding on to traditional values.

Population change
The change in population between 1880 and 1960 within Kildale has fluctuated greatly, the occupational structure of Kildale may have factored in this. The highest peak in Kildale's population is shown to have been in 1880 this may have been due to the expansion of the mineral trade within Kildale. The greatest change in population is present between 1881 and 1885, this may be due to high infant mortality rates and low occupational structure. From the late 19th century onwards, population figures within Kildale began to increase again, most likely due to improved medical facilities meaning a lower death toll amongst infants and people living longer contributing to the age structure of Kildale's population.

Occupational structure
The occupational data gathered from the 1881 census shows that the women of Kildale were more involved in domestic services, for example cooking and sewing, whereas within the male population the most predominant type of work was in agriculture (mostly farming) and working in the mines of Kildale in which they extracted Jet and Iron ore. 
In comparison, the 2001 census shows that the most popular occupation for males and females in Kildale is working in the service industry sector. These industries include; retail, transport and distribution food services to name a few. The 2011 Census revealed a further change, with education becoming the dominant industry among women in Kildale and construction becoming the main industry for local men.

Comparing these census reports, one can see how Kildale's occupational structure has changed over time, going from a more hands on labour approach to working in service industries. The occupational structure has changed most likely due to the expansion of technological development and modernisation. The mines are no longer active, and although farming practices are still carried out, fewer people work in the agricultural sector as with today's advanced technology many machines can do the same job with one person rather than the workload farming included in the 1880s.

Literature

Many books have been written containing descriptions of journeys people have made around Britain between the twelfth and the nineteenth century. William Camden, a historian made one reference to Kildale in his piece of travel writing 'Yorkshire:East and North Ridings’. Along with Kildale being mentioned in a piece of travel writing, a gazetteer entry was also made by John Bartholomew, 1887 commenting on Kildale's geographical situation and the population of Kildale.

Landmarks

St Cuthbert's Church 

The parish church was built in 1868 in dedication to St.Cuthbert. It replaced an earlier church of Norman origin and is approached across an iron railway bridge situated at the western end of Kildale station. The church is in the Early English style and is enhanced by its detailed stained-glass millennium window showing (amongst other panes marking Kildale's community and its beautiful surroundings) a steam train passing through Kildale, created by Goddard & Gibbs in c. 1992–96. A framed list of all the names of the people living in Kildale is also present in the church to mark the millennium. Amongst the list is most of the people that farmed within Kildale parish from the year 1806–2006, the period during which Kildale has been owned by the Turton/Sutcliffe family.
During the construction of St Cuthbert's Church Viking relics were found giving indication that the church grounds have been of great importance for centuries.

Captain Cook's Monument 
Captain Cook's Monument was built in 1827 in memory of the circumnavigator Captain James Cook. The monument lies about one and a half miles away from Kildale and commemorates the man who grew up on a farm beneath the hill on which the Monument stands.

Kildale Barn
Kildale Barn is a listed building at Park Farm in the farmyard. It was a former barn and wheelhouse and, with funds provided by the Youth Hostel Association and the Long Distance Walkers Association, the barn reopened in 1992 as a camping barn providing accommodation which sleeps up to 18 people. Kildale Barn is situated in the North York Moors National Park.

Sport 
Kildale Cricket Club was established in 1902 and the club ground is situated a kilometer west of the village before you reach the River Leven. The club have two senior teams: a Saturday 1st XI that compete in the Langbaurgh Cricket League and a Midweek Senior XI in the Esk Valley Evening League.

References

External links

Villages in North Yorkshire
Civil parishes in North Yorkshire
Valleys of the North York Moors